Pedro Massacessi (born January 9, 1966) is a former Argentine football player.

Club statistics

References

External links

odn.ne.jp
 Pedro Massacessi photos

1968 births
Living people
Argentine footballers
Argentine expatriate footballers
Argentine expatriate sportspeople in Japan
J1 League players
Veikkausliiga players
Liga MX players
Club Atlético Independiente footballers
Universidad de Chile footballers
Yokohama F. Marinos players
FC Jazz players
Atlante F.C. footballers
Club Universidad Nacional footballers
Expatriate footballers in Chile
Expatriate footballers in Finland
Expatriate footballers in Mexico
Association football midfielders